The Lucky Specials is a 2017 South African musical romantic drama film directed by Reabetswe Rangaka and co-produced by Harriet Gavshon, Peter Gudo, Aric Noboa, and J.P. Potgieter for Discovery Learning Alliance and Quizzical Pictures in association with HHMI Tangled Bank Studios. The film stars Oros Mampofu and Sivenathi Mabuya with Blondia Makhene, Richard Lukunku, and Fulu Mugovhani in supporting roles. The film is about a cover band called "The Lucky Specials" in a dusty town in southern Africa where Mandla, a miner by profession plays lead guitar but later problems arise with Nkanyiso, a fellow band member.

The film has been shot in and around South Africa and Mozambique.

Reception
The film premiered on 17 February 2017 at MonteCasino in Johannesburg, South Africa. The film received positive reviews from critics and selected for 12 international film festivals. The film also won Special Jury Recognition at the 2012 Pan African Film Festival and was honored with the Zuku Award for Best African Film at the 2012 Zanzibar International Film Festival. In 2018 at the Africa Movie Academy Awards, the film was nominated for five awards: Best Actress in a leading role, Best Actor in a leading role, Best Actor in a supporting role, Best Visual Effects and Best Editing. Meanwhile, in the same year, the film was nominated for the Best Made for TV Movie at the Golden Horn Awards. It was screened throughout the world in helping communities respond to tuberculosis.

Cast
 Oros Mampofu as Mandla
 Sivenathi Mabuya as Nkanyiso
 Blondie Makhene as Bra Easy
 Richard Lukunku as Jose
 Thomas Gumede as Sello
 Fulu Mugovhani as Zwanga
 Linda Sebezo as businesswoman

References

External links 
 

2017 films
2017 romantic drama films
2010s musical films
South African romantic drama films
English-language South African films
2010s English-language films